Opoku Ware School, often referred to as OWASS, is a public Catholic senior high school for boys, located in Santasi, a  suburb of Kumasi, which is the capital of the Ashanti region of Ghana.

Notable alumni 

 

 Kenneth Gilbert Adjei, former deputy NDC Minister of State
 Kwamena Ahwoi, former NDC Minister of State
 Owusu Afriyie Akoto,  Minister for food and Agriculture
 Stephen Amoah, Member of Parliament for the Nhyiaeso Constituency
 James Kwesi Appiah (O 123) former head coach of the Ghana Black Stars
 George Boakye, former Chief of Air Staff
 Stephen Alan Brobbey, retired jurist; former Chief Justice of the Gambia and justice of the Supreme Court of Ghana
 Shadrack Osei Frimpong, founder of Cocoa360
 George Gyan-Baffour, Minister for Planning and Member of Parliament(Wenchi)
 Ohene Karikari, former national athlete and Africa's number one sprinter during his time
John Kumah, Deputy Minister of Finance.
 Jacob Kwakye-Maafo, physician, surgeon and CEO of West End Clinic, Kumasi
 Christian Nsiah, Olympic athlete and Business Economics professor at Black Hills State University
Paul Victor Obeng, mechanical engineer, Politician and former chairman of KNUST council
 Anthony Akoto Osei, former Finance Minister and current MP for Old Tafo
 Ernest Owusu-Poku, former Inspector General of Police, Ghana
Nana Akuoko Sarpong, traditional ruler of Agogo state, former politician
Nana Otuo Siriboe, Chairman of the Council of State. The Omanhene of the Juaben traditional area.
 Yaw Tog, Musician, rapper
 Jacob Osei Yeboah, politician

References

External links
 School's Website

1952 establishments in Gold Coast (British colony)
Catholic secondary schools in Ghana
Education in Kumasi
Boys' schools in Ghana
Educational institutions established in 1952